Msau is a settlement in Kenya's Coast Province.

References 

MAU
MAU is short for Multistation Access Unit (also abbreviated as MSAU), a token-ring network device that physically connects network computers in a star topology while retaining the logical ring structure. One of the problems with the token-ring topology is that a single non-operating node can break the ring. The MAU solves this problem because it has the ability to short out non-operating nodes and maintain the ring structure. A MAU is a special type of hub.

Populated places in Coast Province